This article lists the diesel locomotives that have operated or are operating on Indian Railways.

Classification 
Locomotives were classified by track gauge, motive power, function and power (or model number) in a four- or five-letter code. The first letter denotes the track gauge. The second letter denotes motive power (diesel or electric), and the third letter denotes use (goods, passenger, mixed or shunting). The fourth letter denotes a locomotive's chronological model number.

In 2002, a new classification system was adopted. For newer diesel locomotives, the fourth letter denotes their horsepower range. Not all diesel locomotives were reclassified, and the fourth letter continues to denotes their model number.

A locomotive may have a fifth letter, generally denoting a technical variant, subclass or subtype: a variation in the basic model or series, or a different motor or manufacturer. Under the new system, the fifth letter further refines horsepower in 100-hp increments: A for 100 hp, B for 200 hp, C for 300 hp and so on.

The system does not apply to steam locomotives, which are no longer used on main lines. They retain their original class names, such as M- or WP-class.

Syntax 

 First letter (gauge):
 W – Broad gauge (wide) – 
 Y – Metre gauge (yard) – 
 Z –  narrow gauge
 N –  narrow (toy) gauge
 Second letter (motive power):
 D – Diesel
 C – DC electric (DC overhead line)
 A – AC electric (AC overhead line)
 CA – DC and AC (AC or DC overhead line); CA is considered one letter
 B – Battery (rare)
 Third letter (job type):
 G – Goods
 P – Passenger
 M – Mixed (goods and passenger)
 S – Shunting (switching)
 U – Multiple unit (electric or diesel)
 R – Railcar

In WDM 3A, W denotes broad gauge; D denotes diesel power; M denotes mixed use (goods and passenger service), and 3A denotes  (3,000 + 100). In WAP 5, W is broad gauge; A is AC electric; P is passenger service, and 5 indicates that the locomotive is the fifth model used.

Broad-gauge locomotives 
Broad-gauge diesel classification codes are:
 WDM – Wide diesel mixed
 WDP – Wide diesel passenger
 WDG – Wide diesel goods
 WDS – Wide diesel shunter

Mixed class (WDM series)

Passenger class (WDP series)

Goods class (WDG series)

Shunter class (WDS series)

Meter-gauge locomotives 
Metre-gauge diesel classification code is:
 YDM - Metre gauge diesel mixed

Mixed class (YDM series)

Narrow-gauge locomotives 
Narrow-gauge diesel classification codes are:
 ZDM - Narrow gauge 2 ft 6 in diesel mixed
 NDM - Narrow gauge 2 ft diesel mixed

Mixed class (ZDM series)

Mixed class (NDM series)

See also

 List of electric locomotives of India
 Locomotives of India
 Rail transport in India

References

Notes

Bibliography

Diesel locomotives of India
Railway locomotive-related lists
5 ft 6 in gauge locomotives
Indian railway-related lists